Juventud (English title: Youth) is a Mexican telenovela produced by Kenia Pérez for Televisa in 1980.

Cast 
Laura Zapata as Modesta
María Fernanda as Miriam
Gloria Mayo as Sofia
Otto Sirgo as Rafael
Carmen Montejo as Dona Cuca
Carlos Monden
Fernando Balzaretti
Leonardo Daniel as Pablo
Irma Dorantes
Graciela Doring
Blanca Torres
Julia Marichal
María Montejo

References

External links 

Mexican telenovelas
1980 telenovelas
Televisa telenovelas
Spanish-language telenovelas
1980 Mexican television series debuts
1980 Mexican television series endings